Avantika Hundal is a Hindi television and Punjabi film actress  She played the role of Mihika in the  show Yeh Hai Mohabbatein. She has also worked in Mann Kee Awaaz Pratigya serial aired on Star Plus as Aarushi Saxena. She is also known for the Punjabi films Mr & Mrs 420 and Mr & Mrs 420 Returns. At least after 3 years leap she come back to television, playing the role of Preesha replacing Garima Parihar in Mose Chhal Kiye Jaaye.

Television

Filmography
Punjabi
2013: BurrahhBurrahh as Harman
2014: Mr & Mrs 420 as Laadi
2018: Mr & Mrs 420 Returns

Hindi
2008: Bachna Ae Haseeno as Mona(Mahi's friend)

Personal life
Hundal is the daughter of the actor Navtej Hundal. She was previously in a relationship with Arhaan Behll till 2014.

References

External links 
 
 

Punjabi people
Actresses in Punjabi cinema
Indian film actresses
Indian television actresses
Indian soap opera actresses
Actresses in Hindi television
21st-century Indian actresses